Sergio Omar Almirón (born 18 November 1958 in Rosario) is a retired Argentine footballer who played as a centre-forward.

During his career (1978–1993) he played for Newell's Old Boys, Tours FC (France), UANL Tigres (Mexico), Estudiantes,  Central Córdoba and Talleres de Córdoba.

Almirón was in the Argentina squad that won the 1986 FIFA World Cup, though he did not play any games during that tournament. Despite playing as a striker Almirón was allocated the number 1 shirt for the 1986 tournament, traditionally reserved for goalkeepers. This was due to Argentina's policy of the time of numbering their squad alphabetically. He's the father of former footballer Sergio Bernardo Almirón.

Honours

Club
Newell's Old Boys
 Primera División: 1987–88

International
Argentina
 FIFA World Cup: 1986

References

External links

1958 births
Living people
Argentina international footballers
Estudiantes de La Plata footballers
1986 FIFA World Cup players
FIFA World Cup-winning players
Association football forwards
Newell's Old Boys footballers
Footballers from Rosario, Santa Fe
Talleres de Córdoba footballers
Tours FC players
Argentine expatriate footballers
Argentine footballers
Argentine Primera División players
Ligue 2 players
Expatriate footballers in France
Expatriate footballers in Mexico
Argentine expatriate sportspeople in France
Argentine expatriate sportspeople in Mexico